Mohammadabad-e Dehnow (also Romanized as Moḩammadābād-e Dehnow; also known as Dehnow (Persian: دهنو) and Moḩammadābād) is a village in Razmavaran Rural District, in the Central District of Rafsanjan County, Kerman Province, Iran. At the 2006 census, its population was 717, in 178 families.

References 

Populated places in Rafsanjan County